Rohan Joseph de Saram (20 July 195314 October 2003) was a Sri Lankan pianist and conductor.

Educated at Royal College, Colombo, Rohan went on to study at the Juilliard School of Music and studied conducting under Prof. Carl Bamberger.

He started his career with the American Philharmonic Orchestra, of which he later became its Music Director. He returned to Sri Lanka in 1990 on President R. Premadasa's invitation, and founded the Philharmonic Society of Sri Lanka. The Society was set up to serve as the parent of Opera Lanka which was intended to be the national opera company of Sri Lanka with a working partnership with Opera India. He died in Rome on 14 October 2003 from renal cell carcinoma.

External links
The musician, the man

References

Sri Lankan conductors (music)
Sri Lankan pianists
Sinhalese musicians
Alumni of Royal College, Colombo
Juilliard School alumni
2004 deaths
1953 births
20th-century pianists
20th-century conductors (music)